Tanaga Island is an island in the western Andreanof Islands, in the southwest part of the Aleutian Islands, Alaska.

There are several large waterfalls on Tanaga Island. Tanaga Island is uninhabited, but several cabins are shown on the NOAA nautical chart, as well as some Aleut villages on the east side of the island.

There are no native land mammals on Tanaga Island.

Tanaga Island was established as a Navy emergency landing field in July 1943 as an adjunct to the Adak Naval Operation Base. The site was abandoned in 1945. The control tower is still shown on nautical charts.

Volcano

The last known eruption of Tanaga volcano occurred in 1914. Earlier eruptions were reported in 1763-1770, 1791, and 1829. Reports of these eruptions are vague, but deposits on the flanks of the volcano show that typical eruptions produce blocky lava flows and occasional ash clouds.

Eruptions have occurred both from the summit vent and a  satellite vent on the volcano's northeast flank. Immediately west of Tanaga volcano lies Sajaka, a  compound edifice.

Takawangha's  summit is mostly ice-covered, except for four young craters that have erupted ash and lava flows in the last few thousand years. Parts of Takawangha's edifice are hydrothermally altered and may be unstable, and could produce localized debris avalanches. No historical eruptions are known from Sajaka or Takawangha; however, field work shows that recent eruptions have occurred and it is possible that historic eruptions attributed only to Tanaga may instead have come from these other vents.

2017
A swarm of earthquakes was reported in January 2017 about 6 kilometers from Takawangha, causing the Alaska Volcano Observatory to raise the alert level to YELLOW/ADVISORY

References

External links
 Tanaga Island Photos Photos from Tanaga Island, July 2008]

Andreanof Islands
Uninhabited islands of Alaska
Islands of Alaska
Islands of Unorganized Borough, Alaska